The UC Irvine Anteaters (referred to Anteaters) are the athletic teams fielded by the University of California, Irvine (UC Irvine). Its athletics programs participate in the NCAA's Division I, as members of the Big West Conference and the Mountain Pacific Sports Federation.  For earlier years of the school's existence, the teams participated at the Division II level with great success as explained below. 

UC Irvine fields teams in men's baseball, men's and women's basketball, men's and women's cross country running, men's and women's golf, men's and women's soccer, men's and women's tennis, women's indoor track & field, men's and women's outdoor track & field, men's and women's volleyball, and men's and women's water polo. The Anteaters have won 28 national championships in nine different team sports. 64 Anteaters have won individual national championships, and 53 Anteaters have competed in the Olympics.

Conference affiliations 

 1965–66 to 1976–77 – NCAA Division II Independent
 1977–78 to present – Big West Conference

Sports sponsored

Baseball

UC Irvine's baseball team won two national championships at the College Division and the Division II level in 1973 and 1974, prior to moving to Division I. The program was eliminated in 1992 due to state budget cuts, but was reinstated in 2002.

Since the return of its baseball program in 2002, UCI has been ranked as high as No. 1 in the country. In 2007, UCI participated in the  College World Series for the first time in school history.  The Anteaters eliminated both Cal State Fullerton and Arizona State before losing to Oregon State, earning a 3rd-place finish. In 2014, the Anteaters returned to the College World Series and earned a 5th-place finish.

Basketball

During the 1982 season the men's basketball team were led by two-time first team All-American Kevin Magee. That season, the team was ranked as high as No. 19 in the nation for NCAA Division I basketball. During the 1986 season the Anteaters were led by future NBA player and former head coach of the Washington Wizards, Scott Brooks.

The Anteaters hired Golden State Warriors assistant Russell Turner as the head men's basketball coach in 2010. Turner was named Big West Conference Coach of the Year after he led the Anteaters to the 2013-2014 conference regular season championship.

The Anteaters won their first ever NCAA tournament game in school history on March 22, 2019, upsetting No. 4 Kansas State Wildcats 70-64.

Cross country
The UC Irvine Anteaters men's cross country team appeared in the NCAA Tournament three times, with their highest finish being 11th place in the 1986–87 school year. The UC Irvine Anteaters women's cross country team appeared in the NCAA Tournament four times, with their highest finish being 4th place in the 1990–91 school year.

Golf

During the early years when the UC Irvine Anteater men's golf team participated at the Division II level, the teams were highly successful for five consecutive years from 1973 through 1977.  Coach Jerry Hulbert formed teams consisting of local southern California players.  The teams played in the NCAA Division II team national championship for each of these five years, including winning the national team championship in 1975.  Anteater team member Jerry Wisz also won the individual national championship that year.  At these national championships, the teams finished fourth in 1973, second in 1974, second in 1976, and thirteenth in 1977.  Seven players from the 1972 through 1976 teams earned All-American honors awarded by the Golf Coaches Association of America, with two of these players awarded for two consecutive years.  After reaching the Division I level, the  Anteater teams have played in the NCAA National Regionals fourteen times, including reaching the national championship three of those seasons.  In coach Paul Smolinski's quite successful twenty-three years as head coach, his teams have played in twelve NCAA regionals, and two NCAA national championships (2001 & 2008).  Arguably his best player John Chin, who along with the above-mentioned Jerry Wisz have been the two best players in the entire school history, earned NCAA Division I All-American honors in 2010.  John has played as a member of the PGA Tour and what is currently named the Korn Ferry Tour.

Soccer
UCI soccer plays its home games at Anteater Stadium. The men's team has been ranked as high as No. 3 in the nation and has made six Division I NCAA tournament appearances with berths in 2008, 2009, 2011, 2013, 2014, and 2018. In addition, since the introduction of the Big West Conference Tournament for soccer in 2008 the Anteaters have won the tournament championship four times. The women's team has made two Division I NCAA tournament appearances with berths in 2010 and 2011.

Notable Anteater soccer alumni include United States men's national team member Brad Evans (Seattle Sounders FC), Miguel Ibarra (Minnesota United FC) and Rouzy (LA Galaxy).

The UC Irvine Anteaters men's soccer team have an NCAA Division I Tournament record of 6–6 through six appearances.

The UC Irvine Anteaters women's soccer team have an NCAA Division I Tournament record of 3–3 through three appearances.

Volleyball

UC Irvine men's volleyball has won a total of four national championships, with titles in 2007, 2009, 2012, and 2013.

The Anteaters made their first final four appearance in 2006, losing in the NCAA semi-finals to Penn State. They won their first national championship in 2007 by defeating IPFW 3–1 in the NCAA final. UCI won its second national championship in 2009 after defeating USC 3-2 in a five-set comeback victory in the NCAA final. The Anteaters won their third NCAA men's volleyball title in 2012 after defeating USC again in the NCAA final, this time in a 3-0 sweep at the Galen Center. UCI's longtime head coach John Speraw had guided the Anteaters to three national championships in six years but immediately after winning the 2012 national title he left UCI after accepting the head coaching position at UCLA.

UC Irvine alum and former assistant coach David Kniffin took over the Anteater program in 2013 and became just the second head coach in NCAA men's volleyball history to win a national championship in his first season. In the 2013 NCAA final the Anteaters defeated BYU in a 3-0 sweep to win back-to-back national championships.

The UC Irvine Anteaters women's volleyball team have an NCAA Division I Tournament record of 1–3 through three appearances.

Water polo
UC Irvine's men's water polo team won three NCAA Division I national championships in 1970, 1982, and 1989.

UCI's head men's water polo coach for many years was Ted Newland. As the Anteaters' head coach from 1966-2005, Newland had a lifetime record of 714–345–5. In his 39 years at the helm the Anteaters won three national championships, and the team was consistently rated among the nation's top 5 programs. Many world-class water polo players have been affiliated with UCI, with more than 70 NCAA All-Americans and 13 Olympians being produced by the program. Four Anteaters were a part of the United States team that won the silver medal at the 2008 Olympics in Beijing.

The UC Irvine Anteaters men's water polo team have an NCAA Division I Tournament record of 29–18 through twenty-one appearances.

The UC Irvine women's water polo team is coached by 2004 Olympian Dan Klatt since 2005 and has led the team to 6 NCAA Tournament Appearances in 2011, 2012, 2014, 2015, 2017, 2018 finishing as high as 4th place in 2012. In addition, the team has won 8 Big West Titles and 7 Big West Tournament Titles under Klatt in the last 10 seasons.

Championships

Appearances

The UC Irvine Anteaters competed in the NCAA Tournament across 18 active sports (10 men's and 8 women's) 96 times at the Division I level.

 Baseball (9): 2004, 2006, 2007, 2008, 2009, 2010, 2011, 2014, 2021
 Men's basketball (2): 2015, 2019
 Women's basketball (1): 1995
 Men's cross country (3): 1977, 1986, 1987
 Women's cross country (4): 1983, 1987, 1989, 1990
 Men's golf (3): 1992, 2001, 2008
 Women's golf (3): 2005, 2007, 2009
 Men's soccer (6): 2008, 2009, 2011, 2013, 2014, 2018
 Women's soccer (2): 2010, 2011
 Men's tennis (10): 1983, 1987, 1988, 1989, 1990, 1996, 1997, 2005, 2010, 2011
 Women's tennis (3): 2007, 2010, 2013
 Men's indoor track and field (1): 1977
 Men's outdoor track and field (8): 1968, 1969, 1982, 1988, 1989, 1990, 2011, 2012
 Women's outdoor track and field (5): 1982, 1988, 1989, 1991, 1992
 Men's volleyball (7): 2006, 2007, 2009, 2012, 2013, 2015, 2018
 Women's volleyball (3): 1988, 2003, 2004
 Men's water polo (21): 1969, 1970, 1971, 1972, 1973, 1974, 1975, 1976, 1977, 1978, 1980, 1981, 1982, 1983, 1985, 1987, 1988, 1989, 1991, 1992, 1993
 Women's water polo (6): 2011, 2012, 2014, 2015, 2017, 2018

Team

The Anteaters of UC Irvine earned 7 NCAA championships at the Division I level.

Men's (7)
 Volleyball (4): 2007, 2009, 2012, 2013
 Water polo (3): 1970, 1982, 1989

Results

UC Irvine won 15 national championships at the NCAA Division II level.

 Baseball: 1973, 1974
 Men's cross country: 1975, 1976
 Men's golf: 1975
 Men's outdoor track and field: 1976
 Men's swimming and diving: 1969, 1970, 1971
 Men's tennis: 1970, 1971, 1972, 1973, 1975, 1977

Below are sixteen national club team championships:

 Co-ed archery (1): 2016 (USIAC)
 Men's archery (1): 2016 (USIAC)
 Women's archery (1): 2016 (USIAC)
 Co-ed badminton (3): 2004, 2007, 2008 (ABA)
 Men's badminton (2): 2007, 2008 (ABA)
 Co-ed paintball – Division IAA (1): 2006 (NCPA)
 Co-ed sailing (7): 1972, 1979, 1980, 1987, 1988, 1990, 2006 (ICSA)

Note: Those with no denoted division is assumed that the institution earned a national championship at the highest level.

Individual

UC Irvine had 3 Anteaters win NCAA individual championships at the Division I level.

At the NCAA Division II level, UC Irvine garnered 61 individual championships.

Facilities

The UCI basketball and volleyball teams compete at the Bren Events Center as the main venue. They train and compete at the nearby Crawford Hall as the secondary location. The baseball team plays in Anteater Ballpark, which is located behind the Mesa Parking Structure. Anteater Stadium itself is part of UCI's Crawford Athletics Complex, which houses the track and swimming facilities.

Rivalries
Since 2006, the UC Irvine Anteaters have participated in the annual "Black and Blue Rivalry Series" with Long Beach State Beach. In this challenge, each school earns points for its collective conference championships and head-to-head victories against each other (across all NCAA sports in which both schools participate). The totals are added up at the end of the season and a winner is declared.

References

External links